Julio Julián (Mexico City, 15 August 1935) is a Mexican operatic tenor, primarily known for zarzuela. His three sisters formed the trio Las Hermanas Julián.

Julián's career debut was in 1955 when he participated in Mexico's renowned "Opera Nacional". He was seen and heard in various performances for radio and television in the 1950s, when he was signed by RCA records.

He lived in Spain for a time, where he continued in his interest in opera and concerts. There, he married the Spanish soprano zarzuela singer Conchita Domínguez, and later moved to the United States. He retired from operatic performance in the mid-1980s to teach music.

He is a member of Jehovah's Witness.

Performances and recordings
Espiritu Gentil
Perfume de Gardenias
Ch’ella mi Creda
Ojos Tapatios
Nessun Dorma
Un Millon de Primaveras
Jurame
You raise me up

References

Mexican operatic tenors
1935 births
Living people
20th-century Mexican male opera singers